Groupe Saint-Paul Luxembourg is the owner of Luxembourg's largest newspaper, Luxemburger Wort, and its news website wort.lu. It is based at a large centralized complex in Gasperich, in the south of Luxembourg City.

In May 2020, Mediahuis acquired Saint-Paul Luxembourg.

Furthermore, the group has other activities and products including: 
Newspapers and magazines (Luxemburger Wort, Télécran, AutoMoto, Contacto)
Internet and radio (wort.lu, mywort.lu, Radio Latina)
Printing and publishing (Myprint, Editions Saint-Paul, Reliure Saint-Paul)
Advertising and classifieds (régie.lu)
Libo bookshops

Newspapers
 Ardenner express
 Contacto
 La Voix du Luxembourg (discontinued)
 Luxemburger Wort
 Point 24 (discontinued)
 Telecran
 Tendances Lifestyle (discontinued)

Websites

 
 wort.lu - English
 wort.lu - German
 wort.lu - French

Radio stations

 Radio DNR Luxembourg (discontinued)
 Radio Latina

Publishing

 Imprimerie Saint-Paul
 Editions Saint-Paul
 Reliure Saint-Paul

Other

 Libo

General directors 
 2003 to 2006: Charles Ruppert
 2006 to 31 June 2009: Léon Zeches
 1 July 2009 to July 2013: Paul Lenert
 1 September 2013: Paul Peckels

Presidents 
 2016-2019: Luc Frieden
 2019-2021: François Pauly

References

Mass media companies of Luxembourg
Companies based in Luxembourg City